Argonian may refer to:
 a fictional race in The Elder Scrolls series of video games
 inhabitants of the fictional Argo City in the Superman comic book series
 inhabitants of any of the places (real or fictional) known as Argonia

See also 
 Argonium, a chemical compound
 Aragonian (disambiguation)
 Argon people
 Argon (disambiguation)
 Argo (adjective: Argoan)
 Organians, a race in Star Treck